The Schleswig-Holstein Uplands or Schleswig-Holstein Morainic Uplands  (German: Schleswig-Holsteinisches Hügelland) is one of the three landscapes of the German state of  Schleswig-Holstein; the others being the marsch (on the North Sea coast) and the geest (in the interior). In addition, the gently rolling hills or Hügelland of the Baltic Uplands, the many small lakes and the long, deep embayments (Förde) formed by the moraines of the Weichselian Ice Age are characteristic features of the area. Its best-known towns are Kiel, Lübeck and Flensburg. The highest elevation in the area is the Bungsberg in the region known as Holstein Switzerland (Holsteinische Schweiz). On the Bungsberg is the only ski lift in the state (not permanently installed). 

The Schleswig-Holstein Upland comprises the following sub-regions:

Angeln
Schwansen
Hütten Hills
Danish Wahld
Wagria including Holstein Switzerland
Lauenburg Lakes

See also
Hageland

References

Regions of Schleswig-Holstein
North German Plain
Highlands